Lashkar may refer to:
 Lascar, a type of sailor or militiaman employed by the British in South Asia (modern Bangladesh, India, and Pakistan)
 Lashkar (film), a 1989 Bollywood film
 Laskhar (novel), a 2008 military action thriller by Mukul Deva, published by HarperCollins. This is the first of a 4-book bestseller series. The motion picture rights of this novel were purchased by Planman Motion Pictures.
 Lashkargah, a city in southern Afghanistan, capital of Helmand Province
 Lashkar, Gwalior, an area of the city of Gwalior, formerly a separate town
 Lashkar-e-Jhangvi, a militant organization in Pakistan
 Lashkar-e-Omar, a Pakistani Islamic fundamentalist organization
 Lashkar-e-Qahhar, an Islamist group that claimed responsibility for the 11 July 2006 Mumbai Train Bombings
 Lashkar-e-Taiba, a Pakistani Islamist terrorist organization

See also
 Lascar (disambiguation)
 Lashkari (disambiguation)
 Laskar (disambiguation)
 Askar (disambiguation), an Arabic word derived from the Persian one
 Askari